Tatiana Perebiynis and Barbora Strýcová were the defending champions, but Strýcová chose not to compete that year.
Perebiynis partnered with Martina Müller. 
Elena Likhovtseva and Anastasia Myskina won in the final 6-3, 6-4 against Anabel Medina Garrigues and Katarina Srebotnik

Seeds

Draw

External links
 Draw

JandS Cup - Doubles